Siad Haji (born December 1, 1999) is a Somali professional footballer who plays for USL Championship club FC Tulsa. A former United States youth international, he represents the Somalia national team.

Early life 
Haji was born in a Kenyan refugee camp, his parents having fled Somalia. In 2004, they moved to New Hampshire. Haji settled in a refugee community near downtown Manchester, New Hampshire, played youth soccer for the New Hampshire Classics, and was offered a spot on the New England Revolution youth academy's under-16 team. However, the distance and financial logistics made it difficult for him to accept a spot in the academy. He would continue to play for the Classics through high school.

Career

Youth and college 
Upon graduating, Haji did not have the eligibility to play in NCAA Division I, so he played for New England College in NCAA Division III during his first year. With the Pilgrims, he scored nine times in fourteen appearances. Between Haji's first and second years, he transferred from New England College to Virginia Commonwealth University where he was a starting midfielder for the VCU Rams men's soccer team, and earned the Atlantic 10 Midfielder of the Year award in 2018.

Professional 
Haji played two seasons in USL League Two (then known as the Premier Development League) with the Portland Timbers U23s. He made 21 appearances over the two seasons, scoring five goals.

On January 3, 2019, he signed a Generation Adidas contract with Major League Soccer and was eligible for the 2019 MLS SuperDraft. Haji, by many mock drafts, was considered a top five draft pick, and some cases, the first overall draft pick. He was ultimately drafted second overall in the 2019 MLS SuperDraft by the San Jose Earthquakes, the highest ever drafted alumnus from VCU.

Ahead of the 2019 USL Championship season, Haji went on loan to Reno 1868. He made his professional debut and his Reno debut on March 16, 2019, in a 2–1 win against Austin Bold, subbing on at halftime for Gilbert Fuentes.

Haji was released by San Jose following the 2022 season.

On January 19, 2023, he signed a contract with USL Championship side FC Tulsa.

International
He played for various youth teams for the United States. In 2020, he was called up by the Somalia national team ahead of their first games at home in Mogadishu.

In March 2022, he was called up to the Somalia national team. Haji debuted with Somalia in a 3–0 2023 Africa Cup of Nations qualification loss to Eswatini on 23 March 2022.

References

External links 
 Siad Haji at VCU
 
 

1999 births
Living people
Sportspeople from Manchester, New Hampshire
Soccer players from New Hampshire
People with acquired Somali citizenship
Somalian footballers
Somalia international footballers
American soccer players
United States men's youth international soccer players
American people of Somali descent
Association football midfielders
Kenyan emigrants to the United States
Major League Soccer players
MLS Next Pro players
New England College alumni
New England College Pilgrims
Portland Timbers U23s players
Reno 1868 FC players
San Jose Earthquakes draft picks
San Jose Earthquakes players
Somalian refugees
USL Championship players
USL League Two players
VCU Rams men's soccer players
FC Tulsa players